Eamonn McCusker (born 20 August 1945) is an Irish boxer. He competed in the men's light middleweight event at the 1968 Summer Olympics. At the 1968 Summer Olympics, he lost to Rolando Garbey of Cuba.

References

1945 births
Living people
Irish male boxers
Olympic boxers of Ireland
Boxers at the 1968 Summer Olympics
People from Banbridge
Light-middleweight boxers